Lim Kay Siu (born 28 February 1960) is a Singaporean character actor who has appeared in several Asian films, notably TV films since the 1980s.

Background
He may be more recognisable in western cinema due to his role as the North Korean villain in Night Watch set in Hong Kong where he starred alongside Pierce Brosnan and Alexandra Paul and as Prince Chowfa, King Mongkut's brother (Chow Yun-fat) in Anna and the King.

He appeared in various episodes of the Singapore sitcom Phua Chu Kang Pte Ltd as the title character's main rival, Frankie Foo, between 1997 and 2006.

Personal life
His older brother, Lim Kay Tong, is also an actor and well-known television personality in Singapore.

Lim first met his wife, Neo Swee Lin, on her debut theatre performance, Dragon's Teeth Gate, in 1986. The two would act as a married couple four years later on the play, The Moon is Less Bright. They got married on 12 August 1992.

Selected filmography
Tenko Reunion (1985) (TV) .... Bandit
Singapore Sling (1993) (TV) .... Sammy
Night Watch (1995) (TV) (as Lim Kay Siu) .... Mao Yixin
Army Daze (1996)
Shier lou (1997) .... Hawker
Phua Chu Kang Pte Ltd .... Frankie Foo (1997 to 2007)
Forever Fever (1998) .... Father
Wenti bu da (1999)
Rogue Trader (1999) (as Lim Kay Siu) .... Policeman
Anna and the King (1999) .... Prince Chowfa, King Mongkut's Brother
Avatar (2004) .... Julius
POV Murder (2005) TV Series .... Mystery Man
Random Acts (2007) TV Series .... Various Roles
Just Follow Law .......Ground Transport Authority Represensative (2007)
Kallang Roar the Movie (2008) .... Choo Seng Quee
The Blue Mansion (2009) .... Wee Teck Liang
Phua Chu Kang The Movie (2010) .... Frankie Foo
Lord of the Flies (2016) (Stage)
Avatar: The Last Airbender (TBA) (Netflix TV) .... Monk Gyatso

References

External links

Singaporean male actors
Singaporean male stage actors
Singaporean male television actors
Singaporean male film actors
Peranakan people in Singapore
Singaporean people of Hokkien descent
1960 births
Living people